The Poudre Rearing Unit is a Colorado Parks and Wildlife cold water fish production facility located near Cache la Poudre River at the base of South Bald Mountain in Larimer County. It is considered one of the smaller units in Colorado.

History
Poudre Rearing Unit was inaugurated in 1948. The facility is 7,700 ft in elevation.

Fish species
Hatchery staff works to produce millions of broodstock rainbow trout and greenback cutthroat trout eggs. They stock 50,000 trout in public waters on the front range. Their source of water comes from surface water.

References 

Fish hatcheries in the United States
Buildings and structures in Larimer County, Colorado
Tourist attractions in Colorado